Eus may refer to:
 Eus, a commune in France
 .eus, the Internet top-level domain for the Basque language
 eus, the ISO code for the Basque language (euskara)

EuS is the chemical formula of Europium(II) sulfide

EUS may refer to:
 Edinburgh University Settlement, a defunct British charity
 Endoscopic ultrasound
 Engineering Undergraduate Society of the University of British Columbia
 Epizootic ulcerative syndrome
 Estonian Students' Society
 Euston railway station, London
 Exploration Upper Stage, a proposed 2nd stage for US's Space Launch System block 1B rocket